The Colorado River is one of the principal rivers of the southwestern United States and northwest Mexico.

Colorado River may also refer to:
 Colorado River (Argentina)
 Río Colorado, Río Negro, a village in Argentina
 Colorado River (Potosi), Bolivia
 Colorado River (Rondônia), Brazil
 Colorado River (Aconcagua), Chile
 Colorado River (Costa Rica)
 Colorado River (Tempisque River), Costa Rica
 Colorado River (Texas), United States

See also